Viśayah primarily means – 'the sphere of influence or activity', and also refers to – 'dominion', 'kingdom', 'territory', 'country', 'abode', 'lands' etc., but in Hindu philosophy, it has been used to indicate 'the subject matter', 'the sense-objects', 'the subject of interpretation', 'the area or range of words' or 'the field of experience'.

Meaning

 (Sanskrit:विषयः) means – material contamination, possessing as objectives, on the subject matter, objects for sense enjoyments, subject matter, sense objects, the objects of sense gratification, objects of sense enjoyment. In the Bhagavad Gita, this word is used twice in its plural form विषया while referring to - on the subject matter in Sloka II.45 – त्रैगुण्यविषया वेदा and to the objects for sense enjoyment in Sloka II.59 – विषया विनिवर्तन्ते. Viśayah primarily means – the sphere of influence or activity, and also refers to – dominion, kingdom, territory, country, abode, lands etc. The word  is derived from  meaning to act.

Application

Anandavardhana defines  as 'habitat', area, sphere or genre; Abhinavagupta defines it as a particular aggregate. In Sanskrit Literature, it refers to the area or range of operation, or objects operated upon, and therefore means the area in which the words can serve any purpose as informing us of anything and includes their expressed, indicated, and suggested meanings (objects) and also the facts that can be inferred from using words.

In his , Shankara has used  to mean - 'the field of experience' – शोत्रस्य विषयः शब्द ग्रहणम् (of the ear/ the field of experience/ is receiving sound). And, in Sloka 79 of his  Vivekachudamani , he has used this word to denote virulent 'sense-objects' – दोषेण तीव्रो विषयः कृष्णसर्पविशादपि that a sense-object is more virulent than the poison of a king cobra.

 also refers to the area or range of words, including their meanings. 'The object', 'the meaning of the word' and 'purpose' are the three philosophical relevants. In Sanskrit compositions there has always been an unmarked arrangement or word order; in the traditional word order the subject is followed by object with gerund and infinitives in between and the finite verb in the final position.

An illusion is wrong perception owing to avidya (ignorance), in which case conditions of veridical experience do not obtain; the locus does not figure as any objectivity or content, it looks as if it is superimposed.

Significance

In the phrase – ,  means - experienced, apprehended or perceived, and  means – any object in relation to a human experience i.e. in relation to perceptive knowledge or intuitive knowledge, and is that towards which the mind is directed.

All six  (orthodox) schools of Hindu Thought, which had developed simultaneously, accept the authority of the Vedas and have given us the dynamic interpretations of the classical texts. Sriram Śastrī in his Pancapādikavivaranam (1st varnaka) reminds us that - "All things are objects of witness-consciousness, on account of their being either known or unknown".

Sadananda explains :

विषयः – जीवब्रह्मएैक्यं शुद्धचैतन्यं प्रमेयं तत्र एव वेदान्तानां तात् पर्यात् |

"The subject is the identity of the individual self and Brahman, which is of the nature of Pure Intelligence and is to be realized. For such is the purport of the texts."

as the subject which is identification of the Jiva and Brahman after eliminating their respective attributes, and their unity, and Brahman as Pure Intelligence which is the state of homogeneity which is "the goal all the Vedas declare" – सर्वे वेदा यत् पदमामनन्ति (Katha UpanishadI.ii.15).

References

Vedanta
Vedas